Red Karen may refer to:

 Karenni language
 Karenni people
 Karenni States